Lowry Bluff is a bluff,  high, forming the eastern extremity of Nash Ridge of the Eisenhower Range, in Victoria Land, Antarctica. It was mapped by the United States Geological Survey from surveys and U.S. Navy air photos, 1955–63, and was named by the Advisory Committee on Antarctic Names for George Lowry, a biologist at McMurdo Station, 1965–66 season.

References

Cliffs of Victoria Land
Scott Coast